The Opéra national de Lorraine is a French opera company and opera house, located in the city of Nancy, France in the province of Lorraine, France.  Formerly named the Opéra de Nancy et de Lorraine, the company received the status of national opera in 2006.  Opéra national de Lorraine is a member of the association Réunion des Opéras de France (ROF), of the European Network For Opera (RESEO) and of Opera Europa.  All productions are accompanied by the Orchestre symphonique et lyrique de Nancy.

History
The company's original theatre was constructed during the reign of the King of Poland and Duke of Lorraine, Stanislas Leszczyński in 1758.  This theatre, located behind the Museum of Fine Arts, was destroyed by fire in October 1906.  A new opera house was constructed in its present location on the Place Stanislas by Joseph Hornecker, a member of the School of Nancy.  Hornecker designed the replacement opera house in the classical style combined with characteristics of "art nouveau".  The new opera house was inaugurated in 1919.  It underwent restoration in 1994.  The auditorium has a capacity of 1050 seats.

On January 1, 2006, the Ministry of Culture and Communication awarded the Nancy opera house the title Opéra national ('National Opera'). As a result, the Opera of Nancy and Lorraine became the fifth regional National Opera.

Matthieu Dussouillez has been the general director and artistic director of the company since September 2019.  The most recent music director was Rani Calderon, from 2015 to 2018.  In October 2020, Marta Gardolińska first guest-conducted with the company, in the French premiere of Der Traumgörge of Alexander von Zemlinsky.  On the basis of this appearance, in January 2021, the company announced the appointment of Gardolińska as its next music director, effective with the 2021–2022 season, with an initial contract of three seasons.  Gardolińska is the first female conductor ever named to this post.

Music directors (partial list)
 Noël Lancien (1971–1979)
 Jérôme Kaltenbach (1979–1998)
 Sebastian Lang-Lessing (1999–2006)
 Paolo Olmi (2006–2010)
 Tito Muñoz (2011–2013)
 Rani Calderon (2015–2018)
 Marta Gardolińska (designate, effective autumn 2021)

See also
List of opera houses

References

External links
 Opéra national de Lorraine official website (in French)
 National Ballet of Lorraine website

Opera houses in France
Buildings and structures in Nancy, France
Tourist attractions in Nancy, France
Art Nouveau architecture in Nancy, France
Theatres completed in 1758
Music venues completed in 1758
Theatres completed in 1919
Music venues completed in 1919
Art Nouveau theatres
1758 establishments in France
20th-century architecture in France
18th-century architecture in France